The Tolt pipeline runs from the Tolt Reservoir in the Cascade Range to the Lake Forest Park Reservoir, owned by the City of Seattle, supplying the city with about 30% of its water supply.  It passes through Seattle's northern Eastside suburbs and also supplies several suburban cities and water districts.

The pipeline was originally built of wood slats wrapped with iron hoops.  A section of the original pipeline can be viewed at the city of Kirkland's public works department.

See also
Tolt Pipeline Trail

References

External links 

Tolt River Watershed

Pipeline transport
Geography of King County, Washington
Pipelines in the United States